Tabish Khan (born 12 December 1984) is a Pakistani cricketer who plays for Sindh. He made his international debut for the Pakistan cricket team in May 2021.

Career
In November 2017, he was selected to play for the Karachi Kings in 2018 Pakistan Super League players draft.

He was the leading wicket-taker for Pakistan Television in the 2017–18 Quaid-e-Azam Trophy, with 37 dismissals in six matches. In September 2018, in round two of the 2018–19 Quaid-e-Azam Trophy, he took figures of 8 for 41 for Pakistan Television against Lahore Blues. He finished the tournament as the leading wicket-taker for Pakistan Television, with twenty-eight dismissals in five matches. In September 2019, he was named in Sindh's squad for the 2019–20 Quaid-e-Azam Trophy tournament.

In January 2021, he was named in Pakistan's Test squad for their series against South Africa. In March 2021, he was again named in Pakistan's Test squad, this time for their series against Zimbabwe. He made his Test debut for Pakistan, against Zimbabwe, on 7 May 2021. Making his debut at the age of 36, he became the third-oldest Pakistani Test debutant. Khan was also the oldest Test debutant for Pakistan in 66 years, and only Khalid "Billy" Ibadulla played more first-class games (218) than him (137) before making their Test debut for Pakistan.

In November 2021, in the 2021–22 Quaid-e-Azam Trophy, Tabish took his 600th first-class wicket.

References

External links
 
https://kensopabia.com/tabish_khan

1984 births
Living people
Pakistani cricketers
Pakistan Test cricketers
Karachi cricketers
Karachi Kings cricketers
Pakistan Television cricketers
Cricketers from Karachi